Honour, Profit and Pleasure is a 1985 British television film directed by Anna Ambrose and starring Simon Callow as George Frideric Handel, with an ensemble cast portraying a variety of other roles. It was broadcast to celebrate three hundredth anniversary of the year of the composer's birth in 1685. The film focuses on Handel's career in early Georgian London.

Cast
 Simon Callow as Handel
 Alan Devlin as Quin
 Jean Rigby as Susannah Cibber
 Christopher Benjamin as Heidegger
 Bernard Hepton as The Bishop of London
 Cyril Luckham as The Archbishop of Canterbury
 T.P. McKenna as Swift
 John Moffatt as Steele
 James Villiers as Addison
 Frederick Schiller as Waltz
 Jonathan Hyde as Aaron Hill
 Chris Barrie as Pope
 Hugh Grant as Burlington
 Pauline Jameson as Dowager Countess
 Miriam Margolyes as	Elephant & Castle
 Janet Henfrey as Hop-Pole
 John Abineri as George I
 Sebastian Abineri as George II
 Suzy Aitchison as Mary Delaney
 David Neal as Shrewsbury
 James Bowman as Rinaldo

References

Bibliography
 Murphy, Robert. Directors in British and Irish Cinema: A Reference Companion. Bloomsbury Publishing, 2019.
 Tibbetts, John C.  Composers in the Movies: Studies in Musical Biography. Yale University Press, 2008.

External links
 

1985 television films
1985 films
Channel 4 television films
1980s English-language films
1980s British films
British drama television films